Kethoxal (3-ethoxy-1,1-dihydroxy-2-butanone) is an organic compound that has antiviral and anaplasmosis properties. It also forms a stable covalent adduct with guanine, which makes it useful for nucleic acid structure determination.

Nucleic acid binding 

Kethoxal, as with other 1,2-dicarbonyl compounds, reacts with nucleic acids. It has high specificity for guanine over other ribonucleotides. In whole RNA, it reacts preferentially with guanine residues that are not involved in hydrogen-bonding. It can thus be used to probe the interactions involved with the secondary structure and other binding interactions of RNA and help with nucleic acid sequence analysis. The binding is reversible, which allows the kethoxal to be removed and the original RNA recovered.

References 

 

Diols
Ketones
Ethers
Antiviral drugs